Michael Gerald Howat (born Michael Gerald Henderson-Howat, born 2 March 1958) is an English former cricketer.

Education
The son of the cricketer and schoolmaster Gerald Howat, he was born in March 1958 at Tavistock. He was educated at Abingdon School from 1968 until 1975. He started playing cricket for the under-13 team before being selected for the second XI in 1971 and the first XI by 1974. He won the Morris Cup for the best all-rounder and broke the School record by claiming 62 wickets in one season. He was also a competent field hockey player. He later studied at Magdalene College, Cambridge.

Cricket career
While studying at Cambridge, he made his debut in first-class cricket for Cambridge University against Leicestershire at Fenner's in 1977. He played first-class cricket for Cambridge until 1980, making 26 appearances. In his 26 matches, he took 26 wickets with his right-arm medium-fast bowling at a high average of 60.00, with best figures of 3 for 39. With the bat, he scored 194 runs at a batting average of 10.21, with a high score of 32. In addition to playing first-class cricket while at Cambridge, he also made two List A one-day appearances for the Combined Universities cricket team, making a single appearance apiece in the 1978 and 1980 Benson & Hedges Cup.

See also
 List of Old Abingdonians

References

External links

1958 births
Living people
Sportspeople from Tavistock
Alumni of Magdalene College, Cambridge
English cricketers
Cambridge University cricketers
British Universities cricketers